Francesconi is an Italian surname. Notable people with the surname include:

 Claudio Francesconi (born 1945), former Italian fencer
 Enzo Francesconi (born c. 1923), Italian professional rugby league footballer
 Fulvio Francesconi (born 1944), Italian professional football player
 Gianluca Francesconi (born 1971), Italian professional football player
 Jeanne Carola Francesconi (1903-1995), Italian chef and cookbook author
 Jim Francesconi (1953), politician and attorney in Portland, Oregon
 Judy Francesconi (1957), US-American photographer with lesbian women as main subject
 Luca Francesconi (born 1956), Italian composer

See also 
 Franceschi

Italian-language surnames
Patronymic surnames
Surnames from given names